Hibbertia paeninsularis, commonly known as peninsula guinea-flower, is a species of flowering plant in the family Dilleniaceae and is endemic to south-eastern South Australia. It is a small, low shrub with few branches, linear to lance-shaped leaves and yellow flowers with six to eight stamens joined at the base on one side of two carpels.

Description
The edges of the leaves are rolled under obscuring the lower surface. Flowering mostly occurs from September to November.

Taxonomy
Hibbertia paeninsularis was first formally described in 1925 by John McConnell Black in Transactions and Proceedings of the Royal Society of South Australia from specimens he collected near Coomunga on the Eyre Peninsula in 1915.

Distribution and habitat
Peninsula guinea-flower grows in forest and woodland often in wet places, and is sometimes common in cleared areas. It is found on southern parts of the Eyre Peninsula and on central Kangaroo Island.

See also
List of Hibbertia species

References

paeninsularis
Flora of South Australia
Plants described in 1925
Taxa named by John McConnell Black